State Savings Loan and Trust is a historic bank building located at 428 Maine Street in Quincy, Illinois. The bank was built in 1892 for brothers Lorenzo and Charles H. Bull, who were prominent Quincy businessmen and community leaders. Chicago architectural firm Patton & Fisher designed the bank in the Richardsonian Romanesque style; local architect Ernest M. Wood designed an addition for the building in 1906. The building has a five-bay facade, with three bays on the original portion and two on the addition; the bays are each marked by a window with a thick stone arch. The original section is topped by a large front-facing gable, providing for attic space above the second story.

The building was added to the National Register of Historic Places on March 23, 1979.

References

Bank buildings on the National Register of Historic Places in Illinois
Richardsonian Romanesque architecture in Illinois
Commercial buildings completed in 1892
National Register of Historic Places in Adams County, Illinois
Buildings and structures in Quincy, Illinois
1892 establishments in Illinois